Philip E. Mason is a British chemist and YouTuber with the online pseudonym Thunderf00t (also VoiceOfThunder). He is best known for his critiques of religion, pseudoscience and creationism. He works at the Institute of Organic Chemistry and Biochemistry of the Czech Academy of Sciences.

Early life
Mason received a BSc (2:1) (1993) and PhD (1997) in chemistry from the University of Birmingham. From 2003 until at least August 2010, Mason was affiliated with the University of Bristol.

Career
Mason worked at Cornell University's department of food science from 2002 until 2012, where he studied the molecular interactions between water and sugar molecules, as well as molecular modeling with regard to proteins and guanidinium solutions. As of 2013, he was working at the Institute of Organic Chemistry and Biochemistry of the Academy of Sciences of the Czech Republic as a member of a research group headed by Pavel Jungwirth.

Alkali metals research
Mason, on his own and with some fellow technical workers, did original physical chemistry research into the nature of the alkali metals (sodium and potassium, for example) and their chemistry with oxygen and water. It has been known since the metals could be obtained in pure forms that they are explosive when dropped into water. It has long been thought this was caused by the dissociation of water by the metal, releasing hydrogen and oxygen which recombined in an explosion.  Mason developed experimental methods and results that indicate the first reaction of alkali metals and water was coulombic (that is, electrical charge forces) in nature which shatters and drives the metal in an extremely pure state into the water, causing both further coulombic and water dissociation. This result, developed in 2015, was completely new to chemistry. His co-authored research was published in the journal Nature Chemistry.

On 5 June 2020, his co-authored research on solvated electrons dissolved in ammonia was published in the science journal Science.

Online activities
Mason's YouTube videos, where he writes as Thunderf00t, have often drawn attention. A 2012 journal article stated that Thunderf00t's channel and P.Z. Myers' blog were "among the two most popular secularist hubs online."

Mason has used his online persona to critically examine a range of topics, including proposals to build roads surfaced with glass solar panels. He has also attracted media attention for his criticisms of Elizabeth Holmes, Anita Sarkeesian, and Elon Musk.

In 2015, Jenny Keller, who ran the YouTube channel "Laughing Witch", attempted to get Mason fired by sending letters to his employer. Keller stated that these efforts were intended to pressure Mason to change what she considered sexist and Islamophobic content on his channel. After promoting the campaign online, Keller eventually provoked a response from Mason, who posted a series of videos scrutinizing Keller and the Bowie, Maryland-based company she runs with her husband, Porcelain Tub Restoration. These videos led to many of Mason's fans posting negative reviews online for that company. On several occasions, Mason has made guest appearances on the Drunken Peasants Podcast.

In July 2020, Mason had several of his videos on YouTube debunking COVID-19 conspiracy theories falsely flagged and taken down.

Creationism
Through his YouTube account Thunderf00t, Mason produced a series of videos titled "Why do people laugh at creationists?", focusing primarily on Kent Hovind's arguments in public seminars. Sociologist Richard Cimino has described the tone of these videos as "that of the professional, well-educated, and articulate British academic expert exposing—in voiceover—the irrational behavior and attitudes of the believer." Mason (originally known only as Thunderf00t) debated with VenomFangX, a YouTube blogger who supports creationism, in a series of public exchanges that lasted almost two years. The series also covered other creationists, such as Ray Comfort and intelligent design proponent Casey Luskin.

References

External links
 

Alumni of the University of Birmingham
English YouTubers
Cornell University faculty
Critics of creationism
British critics of Islam
English atheists
English chemists
English video bloggers
Living people
Science-related YouTube channels
British atheism activists
20th-century atheists
British sceptics
British expatriates in the Czech Republic
Educational and science YouTubers
People associated with the Czech Academy of Sciences
Year of birth missing (living people)
Institute of Organic Chemistry and Biochemistry of the CAS
YouTube critics and reviewers